Pokémon 4Ever – Celebi: Voice of the Forest is a 2001 Japanese anime film directed by Kunihiko Yuyama and based on the television series Pokémon. The fourth official Pokémon film, it was released in Japan on July 7, 2001. The film was directed in Japan by Kunihiko Yuyama and written by Hideki Sonoda. It stars the regular television cast of Rica Matsumoto, Ikue Ōtani, Mayumi Iizuka, Yūji Ueda, Megumi Hayashibara and Shin-ichiro Miki. The events of the film take place during Pokémon: Johto League Champions.

The English adaption of the film was released on October 11, 2002, in the United States, produced by 4Kids Entertainment and distributed by then-Disney subsidiary Miramax Films, which would take over from Warner Bros. starting with this film. The English dub was directed by Jim Malone, and written by Norman J. Grossfeld. The English adaption stars the regular television cast: Veronica Taylor, Eric Stuart, Rachael Lillis and Maddie Blaustein.

Plot
In a forest in the Johto region, a Pokémon trainer named Sammy is warned by a woman named Towa to be wary of the “Voice of the Forest”, which is Celebi, a Pokémon capable of time travel. Celebi is pursued by a Pokémon hunter and is injured. Sammy protects it from the hunter, but Celebi uses its powers to travel forward in time, taking Sammy with it. Forty years later, the elderly hunter is confronted by the Iron Masked Marauder, a cruel and  sinister member of Team Rocket, who seeks to enslave Celebi. The Marauder uses a Dark Ball(a unique poke ball that can capture Pokémon already owned by Trainers, turns them evil, and increases their power to the highest level) on the hunter's Tyranitar and orders it to use its Hyper Beam attack to destroy most of the hunter's possessions.

Meanwhile, Ash Ketchum, Misty and Brock arrive in the neighbourhood of Arborville, spotting the legendary Suicune on a riverbank. Speaking to Professor Oak, the trio learn he encountered Suicune himself many years ago, but they have to depart before he can explain how. The group are taken to the forest by a local named Mr. White, but encounter the elderly Towa and her granddaughter Diana, warned of the Voice of the Forest. Celebi and Sammy appear from the past, but the former hides, while Sammy comes to term with his time displacement. Ash, Sammy, Misty and Brock find the wounded Celebi and decide to take him to the Lake of Life, said to have healing waters.

Team Rocket pursue the children, joining forces with the Marauder. The children are guided to the lake by wild Pokémon, where Celebi is healed. That night, Ash and Sammy bond, hoping the latter can return to his era. The next day, the Marauder confronts the group, using a Dark Ball to capture Celebi and uses its immense powers over nature to encase it in enormous draconian-like armour made from the forest. Jessie is captured; the Marauder admitting he plots to overthrow Team Rocket's leader Giovanni and conquer the world. Ash, his friends, and Suicune battle to rescue Celebi from the Marauder's influence.

Ash, Sammy and Pikachu breach Celebi's armour and convince it to resist the Marauder, regaining his memories and is freed from the Dark Ball's influence. The Marauder and Jessie tumble in the lake as Celebi's armour collapses.

However, upon taking Celebi to the lakeside, it dies in Sammy's arms. The group attempt to revive it when Suicune purifies the lake, but it fails. Just as all hope of reviving Celebi is lost, the Voice of the Forest, which is actually each Celebi from across time, materializes in the sky and magically resurrects their brother. Suddenly, the Marauder appears and kidnaps Celebi, using a jetpack to escape, but Ash and Pikachu rescue Celebi, the Marauder crashing into the forest and is confronted by Towa, Diana, White, and the angry wild Pokémon.

Celebi takes Sammy back to his own time, who promises to reunite with Ash in the future. The Marauder's freed Pokémon go their separate ways, as Giovanni would learn about the Marauder's betrayal and urge to kill him and claim Team Rocket for himself and refuse to bail him out. Ash, Misty, and Brock speak to Professor Oak of their adventure, Ash saddened by Sammy's departure. However, Professor Oak reassures him that friendships can withstand the test of time and he and Sammy will remain friends. However, upon ending the call, the trio are perplexed about how Professor Oak knew Sammy's name, having never mentioned it. In his laboratory, Oak owns Sammy's sketchbook, revealing he is the same character. During the end credits, Tracey discovers Oak's sketchbook and inserts it into a bookshelf for safekeeping. In the end, Jessie is swimming in the lake when James and Meowth find her on a raft. Soon after the Tyranitar which was caught by the Marauder attacks the raft. Team Rocket, having their raft destroyed, decide to relax in the lake.

Cast

Production
The movie was directed by Kunihiko Yuyama and written by Hideki Sonoda. Norman Grossfeld, the producer of the English adaption, said that the animation quality in the film was the "finest yet" from Oriental Light and Magic. The animators felt "tremendous pressure" that their adaption, both in the writing and the casting, held up against "this incredible achievement". Grossfeld says they adjusted the casting so that the guest characters did not sound too "cartoony" – "and instead had a larger than life tone to fit in with the epic nature of this story and the craftsmanship of the animation". Jim Malone directed the English dub that was written by Michael Haigney.

Reception

Box office
The first three Pokémon films, Pokémon: The First Movie, Pokémon: The Movie 2000, and Pokémon 3: The Movie, were released outside of Japan by Warner Bros., but the distribution rights for Pokémon 4Ever and Pokémon Heroes were given to Miramax on April 2, 2002, by The Pokémon Company. Miramax was rumored to have bought the rights for $1 million and by giving up 75% of the profits. Harvey Weinstein stated that Miramax could "reinvigorate the franchise" and that Pokémon 4Ever would be released in October.

Pokémon 4Ever was successful in Japan, where it grossed . The revenue of the films in the United States had fallen from $85.7 million for the first movie to $17 million for the third movie. In the United States, the film had a limited release, opening in only 249 theaters. Comparatively, the previous film had opened in 2,675 theaters. It earned $717,061 in its opening weekend, ranking #18 on the box office for that weekend.  The film earned a total of $1,727,447 during its run in North America. The film had a 58-day theatrical run, ending on December 5, 2002. Much like the next film, it was more successful upon its release on video and DVD.

Reception

Pokémon 4Ever received generally negative reviews from television critics. Some critics called it "predictable" and "disappointing", while others stated that "the viewers won't be disappointed". The film received a 14% rating on Rotten Tomatoes, with 32 of a total 37 reviews being determined as negative, the lowest of the Pokémon film series (original), with the consensus reading, "Only for diehard Pokemon fans". It received a rating of 25 out of 100 (signifying "generally negative reviews") on Metacritic from 16 reviews. In a review of the film, Dann Gire of the Daily Herald said that "nothing feels more desperate than a movie that tries to extort emotions from young viewers. That happens in the animated Pokémon 4Ever, in which colorful characters stand around crying over the shriveling corpse of a magical creature called Celebi. The movie has emotional warmth of tin foil, mainly because it never establishes connections among the characters, or between the characters and viewers".

Tenley Woodman of the Boston Herald said that "Fans 4Ever would be a more appropriate title for the film because Pokémon enthusiasts likely will be the only ones satisfied by the fourth big-screen installment of this Japanimation craze". He added that "the story line is solid, with Pokémon's proxy-fighter premise pieced together for first-time viewers. However, the film lacks the spark needed to make it a must-see flick". Robert Koehler of Variety said that the "script by Hideki Sonoda is thin in terms of levels of action and adventure, and suffers from last minute padding with one ostensible ending following another. A clever notion to pop up in the larger Pokémon epic, however, is the suggestion that The Professor (the Pokémon trainers' long-term, reliable guide to all things Pokémon) is actually Sam, now grown up in the present". He then added: "Yank voices – holdovers all from the past films – remain as irritating and overly emphatic as ever". Tasha Robinson of The A.V. Club criticized the movie's pacing stating that "In the concrete, though, it's deadly dull. There's no point to prolonging the inevitable, except to pad the movie out to its barely feature-length run time". Lawrence Van Gelder of The New York Times stated that when "it comes to entertainment, children deserve better".

Loren King of the Chicago Tribune gave the film a generally positive review, saying: "The latest installment in the Pokémon canon is surprising less moldy and trite than the last two, likely because much of the Japanese anime is set in a scenic forest where Pokémon graze in peace. The backdrop provides a welcome respite from the ear-, eye- and mind-numbing Pokémon action. And the time-travel plot, though less than inspired, is still tolerable enough for adults accompanying kids". He added that "like most Pokémon tales, this one offers lots of exposition and clunky dialogue, but also counters the expected mayhem with a sweet-sided story about friendship and peaceful creatures who prefer to live far from the madding crowd". Angel Cohn of TV Guide said in his review that "the story is a bit predictable and the characters given to restating the obvious (presumably for the benefit of very young viewers), but overall this third Pokémon sequel is surprisingly entertaining, and a mystery surrounding Sammy's identity provides an interesting twist. The film's flat, traditional anime aesthetic is perfectly suited to the look of the bold, cartoon-like creatures, though the animators switch to a more CGI-influenced look for portions of the final battle sequence. While well done, these scenes feel jarring and out of sync with the rest of the film. Quibbles aside, children and adults enamored of all things Pokémon won't be disappointed".

See also
 List of films based on video games

Notes

References

External links 

 
 
 
 

2001 films
2001 anime films
2000s Japanese-language films
Environmental films
4Ever
Animated films about time travel
Toho animated films
Films directed by Kunihiko Yuyama
Japanese animated fantasy films
Japanese fantasy adventure films
Japanese sequel films
Miramax films
Miramax animated films
Films scored by Shinji Miyazaki
OLM, Inc. animated films